Brantham TMD was to be a depot that was planned for Greater Anglia off the Great Eastern Main Line in Brantham.

History
In February 2017, Greater Anglia announced it would build a new depot on the site a former Imperial Chemical Industries factory in Brantham off the Great Eastern Main Line east of Manningtree station. Planned to open in 2018, it was to be the home depot for Greater Anglia's new fleet of Class 745 and Class 755 Stadler Flirts. It is being built by Taylor Woodrow.  In April 2018 construction was halted after the council raised concerns about frequent train moves blocking a level crossing. In December 2018, Greater Anglia confirmed it had decided not to proceed with the depot.

The depot was set to provide joys for between eight and 12 engineers to support the Bombardier Aventra trains that are due to be introduced towards the end of 2019. Maintenance and servicing is expected to occur mostly overnight and the depot will be equipped with a wheel lathe to address flatspots.

, work on the site had not commenced and the company was not able to confirm when it would start, despite the new Aventra trains being set to be introduced on all lines by summer 2022.

Notes and references

Notes

References

Proposed buildings and structures in the United Kingdom
Proposed transport infrastructure in the East of England
Proposed rail infrastructure in England
Railway depots in England